Harun Maruf is a renowned Somali journalist based in Washington DC who works for Voice of America, he has also worked for Associated Press and BBC. He co-authored the book Inside Al Shabaab.

Background 
Maruf studied International Journalism at the University of London and obtained a master's degree.

Freedom of the press 
Amnesty International reported that NISA threats in April 2020 intended to intimidate and harass Maruf. The US Embassy in Somalia condemned the threats, describing Maruf as 'one of the most respected Somali journalist'. Former Somali President Hassan Sheikh Mohamud also condemned the actions of NISA saying it showed dictatorial tendencies.

References 

Somalian journalists
Year of birth missing (living people)
Living people